Koniag, Incorporated is one of thirteen Alaska Native Regional Corporations created under the Alaska Native Claims Settlement Act of 1971 (ANCSA) in settlement of aboriginal land claims. Koniag, Inc. was incorporated in Alaska on June 23, 1972.  Headquartered in Kodiak, Alaska, with additional offices in Anchorage, Koniag is a for-profit corporation with about 3,400 Alaska Native shareholders primarily of Alutiiq descent.

Officers and directors
A current listing of Koniag, Inc.'s officers and directors, as well as documents filed with the State of Alaska since Koniag's incorporation, are available online through the Corporations Database of the Division of Corporations, Business & Professional Licensing, Alaska Department of Commerce, Community and Economic Development.

Shareholders
At incorporation, Koniag, Inc. enrolled about 3,400 Alaska Native shareholders, each of whom received 100 shares of Koniag stock. As an ANCSA corporation, Koniag has no publicly traded stock and its shares cannot legally be sold.

Lands
The Koniag region comprises Kodiak Island and the Kodiak Archipelago and a small portion of the southern coast of the Alaska Peninsula. Koniag's original land entitlement under ANCSA was 895 acres (3.6 km2), plus the subsurface estate of lands allocated to village corporations in the Koniag region. Complications of the land selection process, especially the lack of available land given the region's long history of non-Native settlement, led to land exchanges through which Koniag was permitted to select subsurface rights in lands along the coast of the Alaska Peninsula across Shelikof Strait from Kodiak Island. Later, some of the Alaska Peninsula lands were exchanged for land on Afognak Island.

Business enterprises
Under federal law, Koniag, Inc. and its majority-owned subsidiaries, joint ventures and partnerships are deemed to be "minority and economically disadvantaged business enterprise[s]" (43 USC 1626(e)).

References

External links
 Koniag, Incorporated (official website).

1972 establishments in Alaska
Alaska Native regional corporations